Edvard Buzinskij (born October 8, 1957) is a  Soviet and Lithuanian draughts player (International draughts), draughts journalist and coach, author of books on draughts. He took third place at European Championship in 2008. Winner of European Championship Veterans in 2007 and 2008. International grandmaster (GMI).

World Championship

 1992 (12 place)
 1996 (8 place)
 2005 (11 place)
 2011 (17 place)
 2013 (10 place)

European Championship

 1995 (4 place)
 1999 (4 place)
 2002 (6 place)
 2008 (3 place)
 2010 (4 place)
 2012 (10 place)
 2014 (17 place)

Soviet Championship

 1974 (2 place) in Championship for junior
 1977 (15 place)
 1984(10 place)
 1985 (9 place)
 1986 (10 place)
 1987 (6 place)
 1988 (17 place)

External links
Championnat d'Europe Vétérans
European Championship Veterans 2007. Results
European Championship Veterans 2008. Results

Books
 Эдвард Зенонович Бужинский, Яков Лейбович Шаус, «Теория и практика международных шашек»,  Москва, Физкультура и спорт, 1985
 E.Buzhinsky /  G.Leibovich,  International Draughts. The Tactical Game. Part I. Classic Positions, Vilnius
 E.Buzhinsky /  G.Leibovich,  International Draughts. The Tactical Game. Positions with the Draught 27 (24), Vilnius, 1991
 Edward Burzyński,  Strategia i taktyka w warcabach, Szczecin, Warcpol, 1997 
 Edward Burzyński,  Warcabowe abecadlo. Draughts Alphabet, Szczecin, Warcpol, 2000 
 Edward Burzyński,  Cudowny świat warcabów. Książka dla przyszłych mistrzów. Szczecin, Warcpol, 2005 
 Edward Burzyński,  Dámajáték lépésről lépésre, (raamatu «Warcabowe abecadlo  tõlge ungari keelde). Zalaegerszeg, 2005
 Edward Burzyński,  Warcabowe abecadlo, (raamatu teine, täiendatud ja parandatud trükk), Szczecin, PC-BEST, 2010

References

1966 births
Living people
Lithuanian draughts players
Players of international draughts
Soviet draughts players
Lithuanian people of Russian descent